The canton of Lagnieu is an administrative division in eastern France. At the French canton reorganisation which came into effect in March 2015, the canton was expanded from 13 to 25 communes:
 
Bénonces
Blyes
Briord
Charnoz-sur-Ain
Chazey-sur-Ain
Innimond
Lagnieu
Leyment
Lhuis
Lompnas
Loyettes
Marchamp
Montagnieu
Ordonnaz
Sainte-Julie
Saint-Jean-de-Niost
Saint-Maurice-de-Gourdans
Saint-Sorlin-en-Bugey
Saint-Vulbas
Sault-Brénaz
Seillonnaz
Serrières-de-Briord
Souclin
Villebois 
Villieu-Loyes-Mollon

Demographics

See also
Cantons of the Ain department 
Communes of France

References

Cantons of Ain